The 1962 Colorado Buffaloes football team was an American football team that represented the University of Colorado in the Big Eight Conference during the 1962 NCAA University Division football season. Led by Bud Davis in his only season as head coach, the Buffaloes compiled an overall record of 2–8 with a mark of 1–6 in conference play, placing seventh in the Big 8.

At the time, it was the worst record in the program's history; Davis' resignation was announced shortly after the 34–10 upset of Air Force in the season finale.

Earlier in the year in March, previous head coach Sonny Grandelius was fired by the university regents for recruiting violations, primarily due to the operation of a slush fund for players and families. Ten days later, alumni director Davis was hired as the interim head coach; he had no collegiate coaching experience, just five years as a high school head coach.

A month later, the NCAA put the CU football program on probation for two years; because the university began the investigation and took action, the penalties were relatively light.

Schedule

Coaching staff
 Dallas Ward (defense)
 Bob Beckett (line)
 Paul Cantwell (ends)
 Ed Farhat (secondary)
 Jim Smith (backs)
 Don Stimack (freshmen)

References

External links
 Sports-Reference – 1962 Colorado Buffaloes

Colorado
Colorado Buffaloes football seasons
Colorado Buffaloes football